Kushadhvaja (IAST: Kuśadhvaja) is a king in the Ramayana, the younger brother of King Janaka of Mithila. Kushadhvaja's two daughters, Mandavi and Shrutakirti, were married to Rama's younger brothers, Bharata and Shatrughna, respectively.

While Janaka was the King of Mithila, the King of Sāṃkāśya, called Sudhanvan, attacked Mithila. Janaka killed Sudhanvan in the war, and crowned his brother Kushadhvaja as the King of Sāṃkāśya.

In popular culture 
King Kushadhvaja is believed in local tradition to have had his seat in around Rajbiraj, where there is still an old historical temple of Rajdevi Temple with more than thousand-year-old idol lies of various Hindu gods and goddesses. The temple adjacent to the Chinnamasta temple is regarded to be key temple of the Maithali people. Around Rajbiraj are also present shrines dedicated to his daughters, Mandavi and Shrutakirti, who were married to Rama's younger brothers.

References

Characters in the Ramayana